The Frederick Douglass Memorial is a memorial commemorating Frederick Douglass, installed at the northwest corner of New York City's Central Park, in the U.S. state of New York. The memorial includes an 8-foot bronze sculpture depicting Douglass by Gabriel Koren and a large circle and fountain designed by Algernon Miller. Additionally, Quennell Rothschild & Partners is credited as the memorial's architecture, and Polich-Tallix served as the foundry. The memorial was dedicated on September 20, 2011, and was funded by the Percent for Art program and the, New York City Department of Cultural Affairs.

See also
 2011 in art
 Frederick Douglass Memorial Bridge
 Frederick Douglass National Historic Site

References

2011 establishments in New York City
2011 sculptures
Bronze sculptures in Central Park
Cultural depictions of Frederick Douglass
Fountains in New York City
Monuments and memorials in Manhattan
Outdoor sculptures in Manhattan
Sculptures in Central Park
Sculptures of African Americans
Sculptures of men in New York City
Statues in New York City
Douglass
Douglass
Douglass